The Bobath Centre is the original home of the Bobath Approach, providing therapy to those living with cerebral palsy and similar neurological conditions.  Its services are available  to people of all ages

The Bobath Centre is also a specialist, national training facility for health professionals and therapists.

History: 
The Bobath Centre was founded by husband and wife partnership Berta Bobath and Dr Karel Bobath who developed the Bobath concept

 
Originally, the Bobath Centre  was located in East End Road, East Finchley, a grade II listed building with Historic England.  The buildings occupied by the centre were the former Holy Trinity School designed by Anthony Salvin, who also designed Holy Trinity East Finchley, and the former Industrial School.

The construction of the original school was funded by the Salvin family and their friends, including Lord Mansfield of Kenwood.

References

External links 

The Bobath Centre

Grade II listed buildings in the London Borough of Barnet
Defunct schools in the London Borough of Barnet
Cerebral palsy organizations
Anthony Salvin